Ana Baro (born 2 December 1992) is an Albanian footballer who plays as a striker. She has played for Albanian Women's National Championship club Ada Velipojë, with which she made her Champions League in August 2012 scoring the team's 2 goals in the competition. She has also played in the German Regionalliga for TuS Rodenbach.

She is a founding member of the Albania national team.

See also
List of Albania women's international footballers

References

1992 births
Living people
Footballers from Tirana
Albanian footballers
Albanian women's footballers
Women's association football midfielders
KFF Vllaznia Shkodër players
KFF Tirana AS players
Albania women's international footballers